This is a list of English language television channels aired in India.

General Entertainment
Colors Infinity
Colors Infinity HD
Comedy Central
Comedy Central HD
Disney International HD
Zee Café
Zee Café HD

Movies
MN+
MNX
Movies Now
Romedy Now
Sony Pix
Sony Pix HD
Star Movies
Star Movies HD
Star Movies Select
Star Movies Select HD
&flix
&flix HD
& Privé HD

Devotional
GOD TV

Kids & Music
Disney Channel
Disney Channel HD
Disney Junior
ETV Bal Bharat
Nick HD+
Nick Jr.
Cbeebies
Gubbare
Super Hungama
VH1 HD
VHI

Infotainment & Lifestyle
Animal Planet
Discovery Channel
Discovery Science
Discovery Turbo
FashionTV
Fox Life
Fox Life HD
History TV18
History TV18 HD
Investigation Discovery
LF HD
National Geographic
National Geographic HD
Nat Geo Wild
Nat Geo Wild HD
NDTV Good Times
Sony BBC Earth
Sony BBC Earth HD
TLC India
Travelxp
Zee Zest
Zee Zest HD

News

National Channels
CNN-News18
DD India
India Ahead
India Today
Mirror Now
NDTV 24x7
NewsX
Republic TV
Times Now
WION

Domestic Channels
News9
North East Live
Independence Day (United States)

International Channels
ABC Australia
BBC World News
Bloomberg Television
CGTN
CNA
CNN
Deutsche Welle
France 24
NHK World
Press TV
RT

Business Channels
CNBC-TV18
ET Now

Sports
Star sports 1
Star Sports 2
Star sports 3
DD sports
Sony Ten 1
Sony Ten 2
Sony Ten 5
Sports 18 1
Star Sports Select 1
Star Sports Select 2
Eurosports
1 sports

Defunct
AXN HD
AXN
BBC Entertainment
ITV Choice HD
ITV Choice
Star World HD
Star World Premiere HD
Star World
Big CBS Love
FX HD
FX
Fox Crime
Zee Studio
Zee Movies
ZMGM
Lumiere Movies
UTV world Movies
TCM
MGM
HBO Hits HD
HBO Hits
HBO Defined HD
HBO Defined
Romedy Now+HD
Romedy Now HD
Star Movies Action
Fox Action Movies
Sony Le Plex HD
HBO HD
HBO 
WB
Zee Sports
Fox Sports News
Star Sports HD 3
Star Sports HD 4
Star Sports 4
Trace Sports HD
Trace Sports
Neo Prime 
Neo Sports
Sony ESPN HD
Sony ESPN
ESPN HD
ESPN
Ten Cricket
Sony Ten Golf HD
UTV Bloomerang
Magicbricks Now
News X HD
Tiranga TV
News 9
BTVi
ITV Music
Big CBS Spark
NG Music HD
NG Music
9XO
Boomerang
Toonami
Jetix
Spacetoon
Zee Q
Animax
Da Vinci learning HD
Disney XD
Marvel HQ
Baby TV HD
Baby TV
Zee Education
NG Adventure HD
NG Adventure
Nat Geo People HD
Nat Geo People
FYI TV 18 HD
FYI TV 18
Zee Trendz
Living Foodz HD
Living Foodz
NHK World Premium
CGTN

See also
List of 4K channels in India
List of HD channels in India

References

English
English
List